Legend of 2PM is the second Japanese studio album (fourth album overall) by South Korean boy band 2PM. It was released on February 13, 2013, in three editions:

 Regular edition: CD 
 Limited Edition A: CD + DVD 
 Limited Edition B: CD + CD 

There are nine new tracks in this second Japanese studio album. Tracks from both Beautiful and Masquerade are also included in this album.  "This Is Love" and "So Bad" were released digitally via the iTunes Store on February 18–19, 2013, as a promotional single from the album.

Track listing

There is also PLAYBUTTON Limited Edition. It is released in 7 different editions. Each have the 13 tracks + 1 bonus track.

Release history

Chart positions

Weekly

Year-end

References

External links 

 Japanese Official Website

2013 albums
2PM albums
Japanese-language albums
Ariola Records albums
Sony Music Entertainment Japan albums